Noah G. Allen (born November 14, 1927) is a former American football coach and college athletics administrator.  He served as the head football coach at Pacific University in Forest Grove, Oregon from 1961 to 1964, compiling a record of 8–26, and later served as the athletic director at his alma mater, Wichita State University.

Head coaching record

College

References

1927 births
Living people
Haskell Indian Nations Fighting Indians athletic directors
New Mexico State Aggies football coaches
Pacific Boxers athletic directors
Pacific Boxers football coaches
Wichita State Shockers athletic directors
Wichita State Shockers football players
High school football coaches in Kansas
High school football coaches in Oklahoma
People from Bristow, Oklahoma
Players of American football from Oklahoma